The 1903 County Championship was the 14th officially organised running of the County Championship, and ran from 4 May to 3 September 1903. Middlesex won their first championship title, ending Yorkshire's run of three successive titles. Sussex finished in second place for the second successive season.

Table
 One point was awarded for a win, and one point was taken away for each loss. Final placings were decided by dividing the number of points earned by the number of completed matches (i.e. those that ended in a win or a loss), and multiplying by 100.

Records

Batting

References

External links

1903 in English cricket
County Championship seasons
County